Enneapterygius obscurus is a species of triplefin blenny in the genus Enneapterygius. It was described by Eugenie Clark in 1980. It is found in the Red Sea but the finding of a specimen at Malindi in Kenya suggests it may have a wider distribution.

References

obscurus
Fish described in 1980
Taxa named by Eugenie Clark